Hedleyella falconeri, the giant panda snail, is a species of air-breathing land snail, a terrestrial pulmonate gastropod mollusc in the family Caryodidae. It is the largest species of land snail to be found in Australia.

Description
The colour is some shade of brown marked with radially arranged irregular bands and splotches of black. When the snail is quiescent, the head and foot are retracted into the shell, but these are extended when the animal wants to move around and feed. The upper surface of head and foot has a reticulate pattern in grey and the foot is rimmed with orange. The head bears two pairs of retractable, dark-coloured tentacles, the upper pair, with the eyes on their tips, being twice as long as the lower pair. There is a dark line leading from between the tentacles along the nape of the neck.

Distribution and habitat

Hedleyella falconeri is found in subtropical eastern Australia from Smiths Lake in New South Wales to just north of Brisbane. Its western limit is the Great Dividing Range.

Biology
Hedleyella falconeri is nocturnal. It spends the day stationary and may hide itself under a rotting log or similar location but often remains in the open although it is usually at least partially covered in leaf litter. On most nights it starts to move around and feed, favouring wet nights. It appeared to wander at random and did not seem to have a homing instinct.

Hedleyella falconeri is a fungivore and feeds on the fruiting bodies of such fungi as Polyporus varius and the bioluminescent fungus Omphalotus nidiformis. It may also feed on rotting leaves on the forest floor. It is itself eaten by a number of birds including the noisy pitta (Pitta versicolor) which smashes the shell on a hard surface, the  Albert's lyrebird (Menura alberti) and the superb lyrebird (Menura novaehollandiae).

Hedleyella falconeri is a hermaphrodite and mating usually occurs in February. Two snails come together overnight and each deposits a sac of sperm in a reproductive opening in the other. Fertilisation is internal and some time later, each snail lays a batch of up to twenty eggs. These are cream coloured and nearly spherical, weigh  and measure  in diameter. The eggs are buried in a cavity under the leaf litter and take about six weeks to hatch.

References

Caryodidae
Gastropods described in 1834
Gastropods of Australia